The Yale Ex!t Players, or the Exit Players, is an improvisational comedy group at Yale University in New Haven, CT, United States.  The Exit Players was founded in 1984, making it the oldest improv group on Yale's campus.

History
The Yale Ex!t Players was co-founded in 1984 by Paul Hayslett, ’85, and Steven Florsheim, ’87.  It is Yale’s oldest improv group, followed by The Purple Crayon, The Viola Question, Just Add Water, and Lux Improvitas.  The Exit Players derives its name from its original, longer title "Experimental Improvisational Theater," which was later shortened to "Exit."  The exclamation point became part of the name when a new logo was designed for the group in 1988.

Performances
The Exit Players perform both on and off the Yale University campus, for a total of over twenty-five shows per year.

On-Campus Shows
The Exit Players perform every three or four weeks during the school term, totaling ten on-campus show per year.  Shows alternate between annual themed shows and general non-themed shows, each averaging an hour and a half.  Annual themed shows include:
 The Parents’ Weekend Show, held during Yale's Family Visiting Weekend
 The Holiday Show, held in December
 The Oscar Show, held around the time of the Academy Awards
 The Senior Show, showcasing the group's graduating seniors.

Off-Campus Shows
The Exit Players go on two tours of different locations around the world each year, once in the winter and once in the spring.  On tours, the group performs shows and holds interactive workshops at a variety of venues, lasting anywhere from twenty minutes to four hours.  Past tour locations include London, Jamaica, San Francisco, Los Angeles, New York City, Montreal, and Washington, D.C.

The Exit Players have also participated in a number of comedy festivals and improv competitions. Most recently, they performed as part of the Del Close Marathon in New York City and came in third in the New York City Regional of the College Improv Tournament.

Form
The Exit Players specialize in Chicago-style long-form improv. In their shows, they have performed scene montages, Harolds, and even improvised one-act plays. They also experiment frequently with genre and in the past few years have performed improvised short stories in the style of Edgar Allan Poe, Clue-themed murder mysteries, and Downton Abbey-esque upstairs-downstairs period dramas.

The Exit Players have trained with members of Improvised Shakespeare, Paralellogramophonograph, and Baby Wants Candy, as well as instructors from the Groundlings, the PIT, iO, and Coldtowne Theater.

Alumni
The Exit Players have many notable alumni, including:
 Claire Mulaney, '10 - writer, Saturday Night Live
 David Litt, '08 - speechwriter to President Barack Obama and author of Thanks, Obama: My Hopey, Changey White House Years.
 Fran Kranz, '04 - actor, The Village, Dollhouse, The Cabin in the Woods
 Seth Gordon, '98 - director, The King of Kong, Four Christmases, Horrible Bosses, episodes of Modern Family, The Office
 Allison Silverman, '94 - executive producer, Unbreakable Kimmy Schmidt, The Colbert Report,  writer, Late Night with Conan O'Brien, producer, The Daily Show
 Matt Winston, '92 - actor, Little Miss Sunshine, Six Feet Under
 Ted Cohen, '90, and Andrew Reich, '90 - executive producers, Friends
 Stuart Blumberg, '91 - screenwriter, Keeping the Faith, The Girl Next Door, Fear Itself

References

External links
 The Yale Ex!t Players official website

American comedy troupes
Improvisational troupes
Student comedy troupes
Theatre companies in Connecticut
Culture of Yale University